Volodymyr Fredyuk (born 14 August 1992) is a Ukrainian road and track cyclist, who last rode for UCI Continental team . Representing Ukraine at international competitions, Fredyuk won the under-23 Ukrainian National Time Trial Championships in 2014. He competed at the 2016 UEC European Track Championships in the team pursuit event.

Major results

2014
 1st  Time trial, National Under-23 Road Championships

References

External links

1992 births
Living people
Ukrainian male cyclists
Ukrainian track cyclists
Place of birth missing (living people)